Kristel Werckx (born 16 December 1969) is a former Belgian racing cyclist. She won the Belgian national road race title in 1991 and 1993. She finished 7th at the 1990 World Championships.  She also competed at the 1988 and 1992 Summer Olympics.

References

External links

1969 births
Living people
Belgian female cyclists
People from Heusden-Zolder
Olympic cyclists of Belgium
Cyclists at the 1988 Summer Olympics
Cyclists at the 1992 Summer Olympics
Cyclists from Limburg (Belgium)
20th-century Belgian women